The Self Defense Test Ship (SDTS) is one of the assets of the US Navy. It is a refurbished ship that is in some cases operated by remote control; that capability is designed to support self-defense engineering, testing, and evaluation.

When uncrewed, it can avoid the safety constraints and other problems associated with crewed ships. During typical operations, launched threats attack the ship, and the combat or weapon system being tested responds to these threats, defending the ship. The pre-arranged attack is, in practice, aimed at a decoy barge pulled 150 feet behind the SDTS in case of damage. Systems installed on the SDTS include MK 57 NATO Sea Sparrow, MK 23 Target Acquisition system, Rolling Airframe Missile, AN/SLQ-32(V) 3 ESM, and Phalanx Close-in Weapon System.

The current SDTS is the former , now known as Ex-Paul F. Foster. In addition to being a remote-controlled ship, she is a test-bed for numerous systems, technologies, and weapons, ranging from bio-fuels to lasers. She replaced the former  in 2003.

References 

Ships of the United States Navy
Autonomous ships
Experimental ships